"Feeling a Moment" is a song by Welsh rock band Feeder from their fifth studio album, Pushing the Senses (2005). It was released as the second single from the album on 4 April 2005 and reached number 13 on the UK Singles Chart. The song also reached number 32 in Australia, becoming Feeder's only song to chart there. At the end of 2005, it was voted the 98th best song of the year by the readers of Q Magazine.

The single includes a U-MYX application that allows the user to mix the track.  A competition was held by the band's website "Feederweb" in which fans sent their remixes into a specially designed website in which they could upload their new mix, and the best one would then appear on the vinyl release of the next single.

Track listings
CD1
 "Feeling a Moment"
 "Bruised"

CD2
 "Feeling a Moment"
 "Murmer"
 "Frequency" (vox and piano version)
 "Feeling a Moment" (U-MYX/enhanced video)

7-inch picture disc
 "Feeling a Moment"
 "Murmer"

Charts

In popular culture

The song was heavily featured in the film Goal! 2 starring Kuno Becker.
 The song was used by ITV for their trailer advertising their coverage of the 2006 FIFA World Cup.
 It was also used in a series of I'm a Celebrity... Get Me Out of Here!.
 The song was used in the background of a scene in the British science fiction series Torchwood in episode three of series one Ghost Machine.
 The song is also used on the American TV series One Tree Hill in 3x01, "Like You Like an Arsonist".
The song was used in the "Belgian Montage" of the program Dom Joly Happy Hour.
 The track was used to promote P&O Cruises in its televised adverts.
 The song was played when AC Milan's Paolo Maldini lifted the European Cup after beating Liverpool in the 2007 Champions League Final in Athens.
 The song was played when Portsmouth F.C.'s Sol Campbell lifted the FA Cup after beating Cardiff City F.C. in the 2008 FA Cup Final at Wembley Stadium and again when John Terry lifted the cup for Chelsea in 2009.
 The track is also being used to promote the new Sky Real Lives digital channel.
 The BBC TV show Waterloo Road uses the track many times during the series.
 Used in Irish TV production "A Bronx Dream" about a troupe of American school children from a Bronx primary school who performed Irish dance and formed the group The Keltic Dreams.
 Used in promotional ads for the AMC show 'Breaking Bad'.
 Used in an episode of the BBC drama-comedy series Drop Dead Gorgeous.
 Used in Heroes Unmasked documental based on Heroes, in episode 1x01, "A New Dawn" (2007).
 Used in a tribute to Luc Bourdon by the Manitoba Moose before a game against the Hamilton Bulldogs.
 Used in American Idol (Denver auditions) in 2009
 Used in the trailer of Love & Other Drugs, a 2010 movie starring Jake Gyllenhaal and Anne Hathaway.

References

Feeder songs
2005 singles
2005 songs
The Echo Label singles
Song recordings produced by Gil Norton
Songs written by Grant Nicholas
UK Independent Singles Chart number-one singles